John Sim (or similar) may refer to:

Politics
 John Symme, 14th-century English politician, MP for Canterbury
 John Peter Sim (1917–2015), Australian politician known as Peter Sim

Sports
 Jock Sim (John Sim, 1922–2000), Scottish footballer (Brighton & Hove Albion)
 Johnny Simm (born 1929), English footballer (Bolton Wanderers, Bury, Bradford City)
 Jon Sim (born 1977), Canadian ice hockey player

Others
 John Simm (born 1970), English actor
 Jack Sim, Singaporean businessman

See also
 John Sims (disambiguation)